Aparecida do Rio Negro is a municipality located in the Brazilian state of Tocantins. Its population was 4,848 (2020) and its area is 1,160 km².

References

Municipalities in Tocantins